Qutlug Qiya, or full name Qutlug Qiya Barlas, (Mongolian: Кутлуг Кияа, Кутлуг Кия Барлас, living around 13th–Century CE.) was the son of Ichil who was the Head-Leader of Barlas, he belonging to the Mongol Barlas confederation, he was the Grandson of Qarachar the Borjigin Prince, and the founder of the Barlas in  1227, and Qarachar was the great-great-grandson of Tumbinai Setsen the Khan of the Borjigids, his brother Aylangir was the paternal great-grandfather of Timur the founder of the Timurid Empire in Central Asia.
Barlas
13th-century Mongolian people

See also 
Khamag Mongol Khanlig
Mongol Empire
Yuan Empire
Yesunte Möngke
Barlas
Borjigid
Timurid Dynasty

References